The 1981–82 season was Leeds United A.F.C.'s 63rd season in their history, and their 18th consecutive season in the Football League First Division.

Season summary
For the first half of the campaign, this season appeared to be a carbon-copy of the previous one, with a terrible start followed by an improved run of form that lifted Leeds into mid-table by Christmas. This time, however, Leeds completely imploded after the turn of the year, plunging them right back into relegation trouble, with a series of expensive signings (most notably Peter Barnes, signed for a then-club record £800,000) generally proving misfires.

Despite this, the club still picked up enough wins that a victory over Brighton in the penultimate match lifted them out of the drop zone, leaving them only needing to avoid defeat to fellow strugglers West Bromwich Albion on the final day. However, Leeds went down to a 2-0 defeat, confirming relegation. While chairman Manny Cussins initially promised that Clarke would be allowed the opportunity to take Leeds straight back up, he later changed his mind and sacked him, instead appointing Eddie Gray as player-manager.

League table

First-team squad
Squad at end of season

Left club during season

Reserve squad

Transfers

In
 Frank Gray - Nottingham Forest, 31 May, £300,000 
 Peter Barnes - West Bromwich Albion, 1 August, £930,000
 Kenny Burns - Nottingham Forest, 14 October, £400,000
 John Sheridan - Manchester City, 2 March
 Frank Worthington - Birmingham City, 8 March, swap

Out
 Neil Parker - Scarborough, 1 July, free
 Jeff Chandler - Bolton Wanderers, 1 October, £40,000
 Tony Arins - Scunthorpe United, 1 November, free
 Keith Parkinson - Doncaster Rovers, 1 January, free
 Alejandro Sabella - Estudiantes, 1 January, £120,000
 Byron Stevenson - Birmingham City, 1 March, swap

Transfers in:  £1,630,000
Transfers out:  £160,000
Total spending:  £1,470,000

Loaned out
 Keith Parkinson - Hull City, 1 November
 Neil Firm - Oldham Athletic, 1 March
 Brian Flynn - Burnley, 4 March

References

Leeds United F.C. seasons
Leeds United
Foot